In mathematics, the Schur algorithm may be: 
The Schur algorithm for expanding a function in the Schur class as a continued fraction
The Lehmer–Schur algorithm for finding complex roots of a polynomial